John A. Rowland, commonly known in Spanish as Don Juan Rowland, was a settler and ranchero in the San Gabriel Valley of California. Born in Maryland, Rowland travelled across the eastern United States before immigrating to the Mexican territory of Santa Fe de Nuevo México, where he naturalized as a Mexican citizen and married his first wife María Encarnación Martínez. He eventually made his way to Alta California, where he became a prominent landowner. Rowland Heights, California is named for him.

Early life
There is speculation about several aspects of the early life of John Albert Rowland (April 15, 1791–October 13, 1873) starting with his birthplace depending on which reference is accepted as either Cecil County, Maryland or Pennsylvania. Also, there is speculation whether "Albert" was his middlename as he never used it on official or legal documents. His birthdate is also uncertain, as his tombstone indicated his age at death as 82 years rather than specific birth and death dates. Most census listings indicate a later than 1790 birth and differing birthplace: southeastern Pennsylvania (Census 1850, actually 1851: 52 years old), across the river from Cecil County, Maryland (Censuses 1860: 62 years old and 1870: 68 years old).

At an early date in the 19th century, the Rowland family migrated to Morgan County, Ohio, roughly between Wheeling, West Virginia and Columbus, Ohio along a heavily traveled westward route for many in the Eastern states in the first decade or two of the century. As a young man, Rowland, presumably, followed the Ohio River to the Mississippi and then to St. Louis. From there, he would have traveled along the Missouri River to the town of Franklin at the western edge of the United States. In 1823, using the new Santa Fe Trail, he migrated to the Mexico territory of Nuevo Mexico, now the U.S. state of New Mexico.

Rowland, said to have been trained as a surveyor, moved to San Fernando de Taos, and become a fur trapper for a time, although he later operated a flour mill. In 1825, Mexican citizenship followed before marriage to María Encarnación Martínez.

Workman-Rowland Party
In Taos, a friendship and eventually business partnership was established with William Workman with the manufacture of "Taos lightning," a whisky popular with fur trappers returning to winter in town after a long spring, summer and fall period of trapping. Rowland and Workman were associated with several political actions that may have prompted their move to Alta California. For example, a Taos-based revolt seized the government of New Mexico and the two were presumably forced to swear loyalty to the unsuccessful rebels. The new governor, Manuel Armijo, was in office when Rowland and Workman were arrested for smuggling which although a common pastime may have been retribution for their feigned loyalty to the Taoseño revolt.

In 1840, Texas president Mirabeau Lamar announced plans to peaceably annex all territory to the Rio Grande, including all the principal towns of New Mexico. His representative, William G. Dryden, named Rowland and Workman agents of the Texas government in New Mexico, although they were soon replaced and may have had little, if any, active role in promoting the scheme. Still, the two men decided to leave New Mexico, as the annexation scheme became an outright invasion, albeit a poorly planned and executed one that failed miserably.

Before the Texans straggled into New Mexico and were routed, Rowland and Workman, along with about two dozen other Americans and Europeans, had left New Mexico for California via the Old Spanish Trail in early September 1841. On September 6, 1841, some 25 New Mexican immigrants joined the group and left Abiquiú, New Mexico, north of Santa Fe. The arid environment of the trail was known, so this trip was made in the Fall when there was grazing for the animals, as well as watering places. The size of the caravan probably helped avoid Native American attack. Although the expedition has often been referred to as an "American wagon train," the Old Spanish Trail never could accommodate wagons and, moreover, there were in the group Europeans and, more importantly, New Mexicans, the latter of which had significant Native American ancestry. According to Workman and others, the second so-called Workman-Rowland Party arrived in southern Alta California, on November 5, 1841.

Land grants and ranching
In early 1842, Rowland (usually referred to as "John Roland" or "Juan Roland" in the land grant records) petitioned in his name alone for a land grant and received preliminary possession of the  Rancho La Puente.

Possibly with the grant preliminarily secured, Workman remained at La Puente while Rowland returned, in April 1842, to New Mexico to retrieve his family. They and other immigrants traveled to California and arrived the same year at Los Angeles in December. By the next summer, Rowland constructed an adobe home about a mile east of Workman's built the previous year. They set about improving the land as stipulated in the grant and probably engaging in the hide and tallow trade.

Nothing more is found about the Mexican land grant until shortly after 1845 when the two participated in the action that ousted the last non-California born governor for a Californio. Workman, as captain, and Rowland, as lieutenant, were involved February 1845 by leading a contingent of Californios who helped Pio Pico assume the governorship by force at a battle against Governor Manuel Micheltorena.

In July 1845 the grant passed judicial confirmation status making the grant permanent in the names of both Rowland and Workman. The California Commission records do not support that Workman received in 1842 documentation supporting his rights to any part of the grant with Rowland before the 1845 confirmation. The first petition and title refer to "he" or "Roland" whereas the judicial title version of the grant refers to "they." Whether Workman's reputation in New Mexico was known in California or a suspicion because of his British ancestry is not known as a reason for him to not challenge the title instead lie low as the British thought nothing of extending their territory south of Washington into Alta California before California was brought into the Union.

In 1847, Rowland built the first private grist mill in the Los Angeles region, not far east of his home. Rowland must have been doing well with his cattle, crops, orchards and vineyards as he exhibited at a California State Fair in the early 1850s a sheave of wheat. Rowland and Workman both sold part of their grape crops to the winemakers Kohler and Frohling. By the early 1860s success was enough to impress a touring correspondent that visited Workman's place seeing cattle and horses as well as vineyards and orchards. Rowland was in a good position with the San Jose River running through the grant. It was possible for Rowland to transition from the boom of the 1849 Gold Rush to a livestock based agrarian environment, to include all types of fruits and vegetables.

In 1867 they received a US patent for their land, resulting from a 15-year protracted struggle to legitimize their land claim as required by the 1851 California private land claims act. Indeed, Rowland contacted Henry W. Halleck, Abraham Lincoln's Chief of Staff, who had served as California Secretary of State and who had submitted one of the two reports to Congress about the viability of California private land claims, for advice on obtaining his patent. Halleck's 1865 response was brief, but to the point: "hire a lawyer and give him plenty of money." This Rowland did, hiring attorney Henry Beard, who prepared a published synopsis  of the land claim in 1866 and who was successful in securing the patent.

A deed of partition was not officially recorded until 1868.

Luis Arenas and Rowland were granted Rancho Los Huecos by Pío Pico in 1846. Rowland also claimed eleven square leagues, situated at the confluence of the Stanislaus River and San Joaquin River, by Pío Pico in 1846, but the claim was rejected.

Both Rowland and Workman seem to have been Union supporters during the US Civil War as they provided horses to the federal government. Of national significance, Los Angeles was connected to much of the remainder of the country when the railroad came to Los Angeles following a referendum on the subject in 1872. Supposedly, both Rowland and Workman disliked the railroad going across the rancho based on a 1919 article in the area newspaper that indicated so. But a review of plat route maps show that portions of the rancho were sold to the railroad before the railroad acquired land closer to the depot grounds within the city.

Rowland retained most of his La Puente holdings until his death, after which the tract was divided amongst his second wife and his children. Upon the death of the second Mrs. Rowland there seemed to be complications with the estate distribution. In the 1880s, the railroad boom towns of Puente and Covina were created from the Rowland portion of the rancho and oil was discovered in the Puente Hills on a section left to youngest son, William R. Rowland, who formed the highly successful Puente Oil Company. Today, heirs of Rowland through his namesake great-grandson, John Rowland IV, still own over a hundred acres in the City of Industry and Rowland Heights which are leased out for commercial purposes, though a ca. 1900 ranch home, an older barn, and a later dwelling were recently razed for commercial development that has not yet taken place.

Family life
John and Encarnación Rowland had ten children, of which 2 sons, John and Thomas, married daughters of Bernardo Yorba of the Rancho Cañón de Santa Ana. A third son, William R. Rowland, married, Manuelita, a daughter of Isaac Williams, owner of Rancho Santa Ana del Chino, and would also go on to be a two-term Sheriff of Los Angeles as well as an oil company president with the Puente Oil Company, drilling wells on his land in the Puente Hills after 1885. Encarnación Rowland died in 1851.

In 1852, Rowland married Charlotte M. Gray, a widow with three children. In addition to Charlotte's three children from her first husband, John B. Gray, they had a daughter, Mary Agnes Gray. She married General Charles Forman, who would go on to establish Toluca Lake.

John Rowland died in October 1873 and is interred at El Campo Santo Cemetery located on the grounds of the Workman and Temple Family Homestead Museum.

Legacy
The John A. Rowland House, built in 1855 for Rowland's second wife Charlotte, is the oldest surviving brick structure in southern California, is located on Gale Avenue just inside the boundary of the City of Industry, California, adjacent to the Hacienda-La Puente Unified School District headquarters and is owned by the Historical Society of La Puente Valley, which has recently begun initial restoration efforts and intends to start some public programs there late in 2010. Just east of Hacienda Heights is the unincorporated community of Rowland Heights, which contains John A. Rowland High School. Rowland Avenue in West Covina, California and Rowland Elementary School are named after him.

References

 Paul R. Spitzzeri, "The Workman and Temple Families of Southern California, 1830–1930," Dallas: Seligson Publishing, 2008.
 Donald E. Rowland, "John Rowland and William Workman: Southern California Pioneers of 1841," Los Angeles and Spokane: Historical Society of Southern California and Arthur H. Clark Company, 1999

External links
County of Los Angeles Public Library, La Puente Valley, Community History 
The Adobes of Rancho La Puente – Historic Adobes of Los Angeles County
La Puente Valley Historical Society

History of Los Angeles
History of Los Angeles County, California
People from Los Angeles County, California
People from Los Angeles
Naturalized citizens of Mexican California
San Gabriel Valley
1791 births
1873 deaths
California pioneers
People from Cecil County, Maryland